CRM may refer to:

Publications
 Canadian Reference Materials, certified reference materials produced by the National Research Council Canada 
 Certified reference materials, controls or standards used to check the quality and traceability of products
 CIDOC Conceptual Reference Model, an international standard for the exchange of cultural heritage information
 Commentarium pro religiosis (since 1920), after 1934 as Commentarium pro religiosis et missionariis (ISSN 1124-0172), journal published by the Claretians

Science and healthcare
 Caloric restriction mimetic, a substance that mimics the caloric restriction anti-aging effect
 Cardiac rhythm management, treatments of irregularities in the heartbeat
 Charge residue model, a model explaining electrospray ionization in mass spectrometry
 Cis-regulatory module, a region of DNA

Institutions and companies
 Centre de Recerca Matemàtica, a mathematics research institute in Barcelona, Spain
 Centre de Recherches Mathématiques, a Canadian mathematical research institute
 Centre for Regenerative Medicine, a Scottish stem cell research institute
 Clerics Regular Minor, a Roman Catholic religious order
 Congregatio Redemptoris Matris (Congregation of the Mother of the Redeemer), a Vietnamese Catholic religious order
 Salesforce, American software firm which trades on the NYSE as CRM

Business and management
 Cause-related marketing, also called cause marketing
 Certified resident manager, in a property
 Courtesy reply mail
 Crew resource management or cockpit resource management, an aviation training program
 Cultural resources management
 Customer relationship management

People
 Charles Rennie Mackintosh (1868–1928), Scottish architect and designer
 Chittaranjan Mitra (1926–2008), or C. R. Mitra, an Indian scientist

Other uses
 Civil rights movement, US
 Cramlington railway station, UK
 CRM114 (program), an anti-spam program
 CRM 114 (fictional device), in Dr. Strangelove (1964)